Sonia Rolland (born 11 February 1981) is a French actress who was Miss France 2000. She was the first African-born winner of the Miss France pageant.

Born in Kigali, Rwanda, to a Rwandan mother and a French father, Rolland and her family fled the country due to safety concerns with the Rwandan genocide instigating, especially since her mother is Tutsi. In 1990 they moved to the neighboring country of Burundi. With the growing unrest that led to the Burundi Civil War, they moved to France in 1994. At the age 13, Rolland settled with her family in Burgundy in the small town of Cluny.

In October 1999, Sonia Rolland won the "Miss Burgundy" beauty contest that allowed her to compete for the Miss France 2000 title and at the age of 18 she was the first woman of African descent to win. At the Miss Universe 2000 pageant, which took place in Cyprus, Rolland was a top 10 semi-finalist, placing 9th overall.

Rolland once lived in Paris with Christophe Rocancourt, an impostor, confidence man and gentleman thief who scammed affluent people by masquerading as a French member of the Rockefeller family. They had a daughter together, named Tess. They announced their split on 10 April 2008. Rolland has another daughter, Kahina, with actor and director Jalil Lespert, who is her partner since 2009.

At twenty years old after serious acting lessons with renowned actor Alain Delon, Rolland embarked for a new career as an actress. Following an unsettling incident during which she was attacked in the metro she took kickboxing classes that later proved advantageous as they helped her land the role of Léa in the television series Léa Parker that ran for two seasons from 2004 to 2006.

Literary work

Rolland’ s first book was published in 2007 titled “Les gazelles n’ont pas peur du noir” which in English translates to “ Gazelles are not afraid of the dark”. The book is her testimony to her childhood in Rwanda, transition to a different culture, her modeling and acting career, her philanthropic work and her family.

Her next book was "Beauté Black" which was collaboration with Sandrine Jeanne-Rose, an expert in ethnic and black cosmetics and hair care. This collection of practical guidelines is mainly meant to reach women of African descent. The two beauty enthusiasts focus on three areas: the face, the body and most importantly the hair essentially afro-textured hair as it is an important subject in the black community.

Philanthropy

Rolland's work is mostly concentrated in Rwanda where she focuses a lot on education, as it is one of the things children survivors of the Genocide have missed on.
She is currently collecting funds that will go towards building a school.
With her new documentary “Rwanda Mon Amour” (Rwanda My Love) in the works the former miss France is hoping to inspire other African nations to follow the example of Rwanda by encourage the people to participate in the ongoing changes but at the same time Rolland promises to be impartial and objective about the achievements of the country over the last 20 years. The documentary is expected to make an appearance at the Cannes film festival.

Filmography

References

External links

 Official website

1981 births
French film actresses
French television actresses
Living people
Miss France winners
Miss Universe 2000 contestants
People from Kigali
Rwandan emigrants to France
Rwandan people of French descent
20th-century French women